Carlisle RLFC were a rugby league team based in Carlisle, Cumbria. The club was called Carlisle Border Raiders for the 1997 season, after which it merged with Barrow Braves.

History

Early rugby league in Carlisle
Carlisle City, based at Harraby Greyhound Stadium close to Gillford Park, were admitted to the Northern Rugby Football Union for the 1928–29 season. They withdrew on 8 November 1928, after only ten games of which they won 1 and lost 9, scoring 59 and conceding 166. Their final game was a 36 – 13 defeat by Warrington at Wilderspool on 27 October 1928. Earlier in the season St Helens had visited Harraby Park on Sat 8 September and struggled to record a victory by 8 points to 5.

Rugby league as an organised sport died with it until the early 1950s when a Carlisle amateur side played two seasons in the Cumberland League.

Carlisle RLFC

Carlisle RLFC  was set up and owned by local Association football team Carlisle United. The club colours were blue, red and white; the same as the football club. In April 1981, they were admitted to the Rugby Football League, playing at United's Brunton Park. They were coached by Allan Agar and Nigel Stephenson. The board of Carlisle United used the money from the sale of Peter Beardsley to finance the team. The club finished second in the Second Division and gained promotion in their first season. Their average attendance was 2,950 in that season. Agar departed as coach to join Featherstone as captain-coach in December 1982 having had his request for more funds turned down.

Mick Morgan replaced Agar and Carlisle made their debut in the First Division with a 7–10 home defeat against Wigan at Brunton Park. Dean Bell spent the 1982–83 season at Carlisle but couldn't stop the club from being relegated. Attendances plummeted in the First Division when they finished bottom. Thereafter the club was plagued by debts and poor attendances.

John Atkinson arrived from Leeds as player / coach in February 1983. The first season back in Division 2 was one of struggle - they finished third from bottom of the league. The next year they were on the fringes of the promotion race.

Allen Kellet took over as coach in February 1986 after the sudden resignation of John Atkinson. Carlisle opened the 1986 season with three defeats from four games; drawing the other against strugglers Runcorn. New coach, Roy Lester, got rid of players based in West Yorkshire and recruited a team of Cumbrian amateurs. They were then thrashed 112-0 by St Helens in a Lancashire Cup tie but recovered their season well, won more than they lost and finished in eighth place.

The club moved to Gillford Park, the former home of the defunct Carlisle City, for the 1988–89 season as they were not able to afford the rent on Brunton Park. In a few short weeks they had, with the help of their hard-working fans, built a ground that met the RFL's minimum criteria. The first match was a seventeen all draw with Batley on 3 September in front of 624 spectators.

Cameron Bell was coach from February 1990 to April 1994, he was succeeded by Hugh Waddell.

When a Rupert Murdoch funded Super League competition was proposed, part of the deal was that some traditional clubs would merge. Carlisle were to merge with Whitehaven, Workington Town and Barrow to form a Cumbria side to be based in Workington who would compete in Super League. This was, however, resisted.

A new name, Carlisle Border Raiders, was adopted for the 1997 season. Home crowds struggled to get into four figures and at the end of the season they merged with Barrow Braves to form Barrow Border Raiders. Their last league match on 20 July 1997, had produced a record score of 72–10 against another doomed side Prescot Panthers. Their final game was at home against Workington on 7 September 1997 which they lost 34–24 in front of a crowd of 453. The merged team played all its matches in Barrow and in 2002 dropped the 'Border' from its name.

Playing record

Past coaches
Also see :Category:Carlisle RLFC coaches.

 Allan Agar & Nigel Stephenson 1981-2
 Mick Morgan 1982-3
 John Atkinson 1983-6
 Allen Kellet 1986
 Roy Lester 1986-88
 Tommy Dawes 1989
 Cameron Bell 1990-1994
 Hugh Waddell 1994-?
 Paul Charlton 1995-6

Notable former players
These players have either; received a Testimonial match, were international representatives before, or after, their time at Carlisle, or are notable outside of rugby league.
 Robert Ackerman won caps for Wales while at Carlisle
 Allan Agar
 Stewart Rhodes
 Colin Armstrong
 John Atkinson
 Dean Bell
 Steve Brierley
 Sean Cusack won caps for Scotland while at Carlisle
 Steve Ferres
 Clayton Friend
 Steve Georgallis
 George Graham
 Richard Henare
 Simon Knox
 Michael "Mick" Morgan
 Matthew Nable
 Hitro Okesene
 Kevin Pape (Testimonial match 1994)
 William "Willie" Richardson 
 John Risman
 Graeme Robinson (from Featherstone Rovers)
 Danny Russell won caps for Scotland while at Carlisle
 Nigel Stephenson
 Stewart Rhodes
 Mal Thomason (Testimonial match 1990)
 James "Jimmy" Thompson
 Hugh Waddell
 Barry Williams won caps for Wales while at Carlisle

Sources
 http://members.tripod.com/peterflower/table.htm
 Photos of Carlisle RLFC jerseys from OLDRUGBYSHIRTS.com

Defunct rugby league teams in England
Rugby league teams in Cumbria
Rugby clubs established in 1981
Sport in Carlisle, Cumbria
English rugby league teams